Vasyl Rybalko (6 June 1918 – 1973) was a Soviet wrestler. He competed in the men's freestyle welterweight at the 1952 Summer Olympics and was affiliated with Dynamo Kiev.

References

1918 births
1973 deaths
Ukrainian male sport wrestlers
Soviet male sport wrestlers
Olympic wrestlers of the Soviet Union
Wrestlers at the 1952 Summer Olympics
Dynamo sports society athletes
Place of birth missing